Hercules station (officially the Hercules Regional Intermodal Transit Center) is a proposed intermodal infill train station and ferry terminal in Hercules, California in Contra Costa County. It is to be the first direct Amtrak-to-ferry transit hub in the San Francisco Bay Area and will be constructed in between the existing  and  stations. By July 2018, three of the station's six construction phases had been complete, including street at Bay Trail approaches.

Overview

The station site at Hercules Point, adjacent to Bayfront Boulevard in Hercules, is the subject of a redevelopment effort of the city of Hercules as an office, residential TOD or Transit-oriented development, and intermodal transit hub with a corresponding WestCat bus station and Water Transit Authority ferry terminal.  The buses would provide feeder service from the surrounding communities of Pinole, Rodeo, El Sobrante, Crockett, Tara Hills, and Richmond.

Rail
The station will also host a future Amtrak station. The Capitol Corridor Joint Powers Authority granted the station candidate status in February 2020. The governing body of San Joaquin services are studying adding Hercules as an additional stop .

Ferry
The ferry will take approximately 42 minutes to San Francisco. Ridership is projected at 1,022 passengers per day by the year 2025.  The route will run between this terminal and the San Francisco Ferry Building where passengers may walk, bike or take Muni or BART to nearby job centers in the city's downtown Financial District.

Transit village
A bike and pedestrian friendly community  will be built up around the hub to connect it to existing housing in the nearby Refugio and Central neighborhoods. It will feature 220 live/work dwellings in addition to 490,000 sq. ft. (45,522m²) of office, retail (including restaurants and cafes), and public space.

Funding
The money for this project is being coordinated by partnerships and cooperation between the Capitol Corridor Joint Powers Authority, the City of Hercules, and WETA. Funds will be collected from various sources including the Federal Ferryboat Discretionary Fund, Contra Costa County Measure J Sales Tax, Transit Impact Fees, and farebox revenue.

References

External links

City of Hercules project website
Environmental Impact Statement
WETA - Expansion
Google maps

Amtrak stations in Contra Costa County, California
Ferry terminals in the San Francisco Bay Area
Hercules, California
Future Amtrak stations in the United States
Proposed public transportation in the San Francisco Bay Area
San Francisco Bay Trail